Greenville is a city in Hunt County, Texas, United States, about  northeast of Dallas. It is the county seat and largest city of Hunt County. As of the 2010 census, the city population was 25,557, and in 2019, its estimated population was 28,827. The town's slogan from 1921 to the 1960s was: "The blackest land, the whitest people."

Greenville was named for Thomas J. Green, a significant contributor to the founding of the Texas Republic.

History

Greenville was founded in 1846. The city was named after Thomas J. Green, a significant contributor to the establishment of the Texas Republic. He later became a member of the Congress of the Texas Republic.

As the Civil War loomed, Greenville was divided over the issue of secession, as were several area towns and counties. Greenville attorney and State Senator Martin D. Hart was a prominent Unionist. He formed a company of men who fought for the Union in Arkansas, even as other Greenville residents fought for the Confederacy. The divided nature of Greenville and Hunt County is noted by a historical marker in "The SPOT" Park at 2800 Lee Street in downtown Greenville. In the post-Civil War era, Greenville's economy became partly dependent on cotton, as the local economy entered a period of transition.

With a population of 12,384 in the 1920 census, the city was the 20th-largest city in Texas at the time.

In World War II, the Mexican Escuadrón 201 was stationed in Greenville while training at nearby Majors Field.

Greenville was notorious for a large sign, installed on July 7, 1921, over Lee Street, the main street in the downtown district, between the train station and the bus station in the 1920s to 1960s. The sign read: "Welcome to Greenville, The Blackest Land, The Whitest People." According to history teacher Paul E. Sturdevant of Greenville, the original intent behind "the whitest people" was to define "the citizens of Greenville as friendly, trustworthy, and
helpful was sincere, and it was meant to include all citizens, regardless of race." In pre-civil rights America, the phrase "That's mighty White of you" meant that you were honest, not like suspect Blacks. The sign thus acquired racial overtones, and the original sign was taken down and placed into storage on April 13, 1965, possibly at the urging of Texas Governor John Connally, who had made a visit to the town weeks before. In 1968, Greenville's Sybil Maddux had the sign reinstalled, with the wording modified to read "The Greatest People"; the original sign is in the collection of the Audie Murphy American Cotton Museum.

In 1957, Greenville annexed the small town of Peniel, which had been founded in 1899 as a Pentecostal Church of the Nazarene community centered around Texas Holiness University. The annexation was approved by the citizens of Peniel, which at the time had a population around 157.

On May 12, 2011, a white buffalo was born near Greenville during a thunderstorm on the ranch of Arby Littlesoldier, who identified himself as a great-great grandson of Sitting Bull. A public naming ceremony and dedication was held on June 29, 2011, during which the male calf was officially given the name "Lightning Medicine Cloud". However, on August 21, 2012, Lightning Medicine Cloud died. The sheriff's department declared it had died from a bacterial infection, but the owners disagree, claiming that the buffalo was allegedly skinned by an unknown party.

Geography
 

The Cowleech Fork of the Sabine River flows through the northeast part of the city.

Climate
Greenville has a humid subtropical climate. Due to its location on the North Texas prairies, its weather is typically humid with mild precipitation.

Demographics

As of the 2020 United States census, there were 28,164 people, 10,454 households, and 6,602 families residing in the city.

Economy

In early years, Hunt County was known as the cotton capital of the world. The world's largest inland cotton compress was located in Greenville until it was destroyed by fire in the mid-1900s.

Currently, the largest industry is L3Harris Mission Integration Division (MID, formerly L3, E-Systems, Raytheon Intelligence and Information Systems (RIIS, IIS)) a major U.S. defense contractor located at Majors Airport. This airport, created in 1942 and initially financed by the local Rotary Club, was used as a training base for P-47 Thunderbolt fighter pilots in World War II, and since then has served as a focal point for economic growth in Greenville.

Tourism is playing an increasing role in the local economy, with attractions such as Splash Kingdom Water Park located on Interstate 30, and the redeveloping historic downtown featuring Landon Winery and the restored vintage Texan Theater, which opened in 2014. Tourism promotion has been under the wing of the Greenville Chamber of Commerce Convention and Visitors Bureau and the City of Greenville, which took over CVB duties in 2014. Greenville is also known for its saddlemaking industry.

According to the city's 2017–2018 Comprehensive Annual Financial Report, the top employers in the city are:

Entertainment includes the Kenneth Threadgill Concert series, which brings well-known Texas performers to the Municipal Auditorium stage in three concerts per year; the Greenville Entertainment Series, a subscription concert series featuring artists from a variety of musical genres; the Symphony Festival Series, which brings the world-famous Dallas Symphony Orchestra to Greenville for three concerts and an additional children's concert per year; and the Greenville Follies, a musical review showcasing local talent every other year. Local clubs with musical entertainment, live theater in nearby Commerce, local art shows, a movie theater and a bowling alley offer year-round entertainment.

Tourism draws include the Audie Murphy/American Cotton Museum and the historic downtown area, which includes wineries, antique malls, public gardens, boutique shopping, and regular events at the 1,700-seat Greenville Municipal Auditorium. The vintage Texan Theater was slated for a grand re-opening in 2014. The Rally 'Round Greenville festival is held the third weekend each September and includes the Cotton Patch Challenge Bicycle Ride, an art show, a barbecue and chili cook-off, Texas Music Weekend, Kids Alley, and more. Backstreet Bash is held in March to celebrate the revitalization of the historic Main Street Area.

Greenville is also home to the Hunt Regional Medical Center.

Media

Greenville is served by Dallas/Fort Worth television stations on local cable and also regular programming.

KGVL radio serves the city of Greenville. KETR in Commerce also serves the city of Greenville due to the proximity of the two cities.

In addition to The Dallas Morning News, which serves the entire Dallas/Fort Worth area, Greenville is served by a local daily newspaper, the Herald-Banner.

Education

Primary and secondary education of Greenville is provided by Greenville Independent School District along with private institutions such as Greenville Christian School.

Postsecondary education is offered through Paris Junior College-Greenville Center.

Government

Local government

According to the city's most recent Comprehensive Annual Financial Report Fund Financial Statements, the city's various funds had $19.9 million in revenues, $21.7 million in expenditures, $10.1 million in total assets, $1.8 million in total liabilities, and $1.4 million in investments.

The structure of the management and coordination of city services is:

Greenville is a voluntary member of the North Central Texas Council of Governments, the purpose of which is to coordinate individual and collective local governments and facilitate regional solutions, eliminate unnecessary duplication, and enable joint decisions.

State government
Greenville is represented in the Texas Senate by Republican Bob Hall, District 2, and in the Texas House of Representatives by Republican Bryan Slaton District 2.

The Texas Department of Criminal Justice  operates the Greenville District Parole Office in Greenville.

Federal government
Republicans John Cornyn and Ted Cruz are Texas’s U. S. Senators.  Since 2021 Republican Pat Fallon has represented Texas's 4th congressional district, including Greenville. (John Ratcliffe’s 2020 appointment as Director of National Intelligence had left the seat vacant.)

The United States Postal Service operates the Greenville, Greenville Finance, and Rolling Hills post offices.

Transportation

Roads

Interstate 30
  Interstate 30 (Martin Luther King Jr. Freeway) is a major route through Greenville. To the west, Interstate 30 goes through Rockwall and Dallas to Fort Worth. To the east, Interstate 30 goes through Sulphur Springs, Mount Pleasant, and Texarkana.

Commercial and residential developments line the interstate from Monty Stratton Parkway through Lamar Street. The frontage roads have recently been converted to one-way for safety due to increased traffic.

U.S. highways
  U.S. Highway 67 (Martin Luther King Jr. Freeway) runs concurrent with Interstate 30 through Greenville.
  U.S. 69 (Joe Ramsey Boulevard) serves as a partial loop through Greenville. It connects with Celeste, Leonard, and Denison to the north and with Lone Oak, Mineola, and Tyler to the south. U.S. 69 is a four-lane divided highway from U.S. 380 / Texas Highway 302 to just past Business U.S. 69 (Moulton Street).
  U.S. 380 (Joe Ramsey Boulevard/Lee Street) heads west out of Greenville through Farmersville, McKinney, and Denton. U.S. 380 is a four-lane divided highway. Within Greenville city limits it runs mostly concurrent with U.S. 69 along Joe Ramsey Boulevard.
  Business U.S. 69 follows several local streets which serve the northern, downtown, and southern areas of the city. It starts and ends at U.S. 69. The local street names are Rees Street (through Peniel), Sockwell Street (north of downtown), Stonewall Street / Johnson Street (couplet through downtown, where Stonewall is southbound and Johnson is northbound), Park Street (east of downtown), and Moulton Street (south of downtown and over Interstate 30).

State highways
  Texas Highway 34 (Wesley Street, Wolfe City Drive) serves as a primary north-south route through Greenville and is a main commercial corridor. Connects with Wolfe City to the north and Quinlan to the south.
  Texas Highway 66 (Old Dallas Highway) heads southwest out of the city towards Caddo Mills and Royse City.
  Texas Highway 224 (Commerce Drive) heads northeast out of the city towards Commerce and Cooper.
  Texas Highway Spur 302 (Lee Street / Washington Street) serves as an east-west route through Greenville. It starts at U.S. 69 / U.S. 380 at the west end and ends at Interstate 30 at the east end. The route, mostly on Lee Street, goes through downtown as a couplet, where Lee Street goes eastbound and Washington Street goes westbound.

Farm-to-Market roads
  Farm Road 118 (Fannin Street) heads north out of Greenville from FM 499 towards Jacobia.
  Farm Road 499 (Forester Street) heads east out of Greenville from Spur 302 going through Campbell and Cumby.
  Farm Road 1569 heads west out of Greenville from a junction with highway 69 towards Merit.
  Farm Road 1570 (Jack Finney Boulevard) serves the southern parts of the city, particularly the L-3 facility / Majors Field Airport.
  Farm Road 2101 heads south out of Greenville from Majors Airport towards Boles Home in Quinlan.

Airports

The nearest airports with passenger air service are Dallas Love Field (55.4 miles) and Dallas/Fort Worth International Airport (70.0 miles).

Majors Airport is a municipal airport located in Greenville.

Public transportation

"The Connection" serves Greenville and all of Hunt County. The transit system operates Monday through Friday from 7 am to 7 pm. Reservations have to be made one day in advance. The charge is $2 ($4 round trip) if the passenger is traveling to a place within the same community or city, and $3 ($6 round trip) if the passenger is traveling from one city or community to another within Hunt County. The Connection will take Hunt County residents to Dallas, on a round-trip only basis: passengers are charged $34, and a minimum of three passengers is required.

Notable people
 Byron Bell, player for NFL's Green Bay Packers and Dallas Cowboys
 Yusuf Bey, Black Muslim activist, founder of Your Black Muslim Bakery in Oakland, California
 John Boles, movie and stage actor of the early 20th century
 Brandon Couts, athlete, Baylor University Hall of Famer who ran professionally and specialized in 400 meter dash
 Maud Crawford, first woman to practice law in Camden, Arkansas; disappeared in 1957 amid international attention; born in Greenville in 1891
 Kay Granger, a Republican politician representing Texas' 12th congressional district in the U.S. House of Representatives
 Dean E. Hallmark, pilot in the Doolittle Raid of April 18, 1942, on Tokyo; captured and executed by Japanese; member of  first Greenville High School football team to reach state playoffs in 1931
 Mack Harrell, operatic baritone; father of cellist Lynn Harrell
 Stanley Hauerwas, Gilbert T. Rowe Professor of Theological Ethics at Duke Divinity School; named "America's Best Theologian" by Time magazine;
 Burt Hooton, Major League Baseball pitcher who won 151 games with the Chicago Cubs, Los Angeles Dodgers and Texas Rangers (1971–1985); pitched no-hitter in 1972; member of 1981 World Series champion Dodgers
 V. E. Howard, minister of Church of Christ who founded radio's International Gospel Hour; formerly a clergyman in Greenville
 Ben Kweller, rock musician
 Haldor Lillenas, prolific hymn writer and Gospel Music Hall of Fame inductee, pastor of the Church of the Nazarene from 1920 to 1923
 George Maddox, former NFL player
 Kimberly McCarthy, convicted murderer, 500th person executed in Texas since return of
 Bart Millard, lead singer and founder of contemporary Christian band MercyMe
 Robert Neyland, Hall of Fame football coach at Tennessee and decorated officer in U.S. Army
 Collin Raye, country music singer
 Monty Stratton, Major League Baseball pitcher from the 1930s; portrayed by Jimmy Stewart in The Stratton Story
 Earl Thomas, former wide receiver of NFL's Chicago Bears, St. Louis Cardinals, and Houston Oilers
 Jimmy Thomas, former running back of NFL's San Francisco 49ers
 Mike Thomas, NFL running back for the Washington Redskins and San Diego Chargers; won Offensive Rookie of the Year in 1975 and went to Pro Bowl after 1976 NFL season
 Francia White, opera singer, radio and television personality during 1930s and 1940s
 Buzz Williams, head coach of men's basketball team at Texas A&M University

See also

 Audie Murphy American Cotton Museum
 Majors Stadium

Photo Gallery

Notes

References

 Romero, Simon. "A Texas Town Nervously Awaits a New Neighbor", New York Times, August 21, 2005.

Further reading
 Babb, Milton. (2010). "Hunt County, An Illustrated History." Historical Publishing Network. 
 Huey, Brenda. (2006). The Blackest Land The Whitest People. Bloomington: AuthorHouse. 
 Mathews, Paul. (2001). I Remember... Personal Reflections on Greenville and Hunt County, Texas. Henington Publishing.

External links

 City of Greenville official website
 Greenville Chamber of Commerce
 Friends of Main Street
 The Herald-Banner

Dallas–Fort Worth metroplex
Cities in Texas
Cities in Hunt County, Texas
County seats in Texas
Populated places established in 1846
1846 establishments in Texas